The 1989 World Games were held in Karlsruhe, West Germany, from July 20 to 30, 1989.

Artistic roller skating

Bodybuilding

Bowling

Field archery

Finswimming

Fistball

Indoor cycling

Inline speed skating

Karate

Korfball

Lifesaving

Netball

Pétanque

Powerlifting

Roller hockey

Taekwondo

Trampoline gymnastics

Tug of war

Water skiing

References

External links
 International World Games Association

Medalists
1989